Louis Bryant Tuckerman, III (November 28, 1915 – May 19, 2002) was an American mathematician, born in Lincoln, Nebraska. He was a member of the team that developed the Data Encryption Standard (DES).

He studied topology at Princeton, where he invented the Tuckerman traverse method for revealing all the faces of a flexagon.

On March 4, 1971, he discovered the 24th Mersenne prime, a titanic prime, with a value of

.

References

External links 
Tuckerman Obituary

20th-century American mathematicians
21st-century American mathematicians
1915 births
2002 deaths
IBM employees
People from Briarcliff Manor, New York
Mathematicians from New York (state)